The Midnight Show is a live album by saxophonists Eddie "Lockjaw" Davis and Johnny Griffin recorded at Minton's Playhouse in 1961 and released on the Prestige label in 1964. The album was the third release from the recordings at Minton's after The Tenor Scene and The First Set.

Track listing 
 "In Walked Bud" (Thelonious Monk) - 6:14   
 "Land of Dreams" (Norman Gimbel, Eddie Heywood) - 7:52   
 "Beano" (John Campbell) - 6:42   
 "Robbins Nest" (Illinois Jacquet, Bob Russell, Sir Charles Thompson) - 10:12   
 "Our Delight" (Tadd Dameron) - 7:17   
 "Theme" (Traditional) - 1:03

Personnel 
Eddie "Lockjaw" Davis, Johnny Griffin - tenor saxophone
 Junior Mance - piano
 Larry Gales - bass
 Ben Riley - drums

References 

Eddie "Lockjaw" Davis live albums
Johnny Griffin live albums
1964 live albums
Albums produced by Esmond Edwards
Prestige Records live albums